Avtar Singh is an Indian politician and former member of the Sixth Legislative Assembly of Delhi of India. He  represented the Kalkaji constituency of Delhi and is a member of the Aam Aadmi Party political party.

Early life and education
Avtar Singh was born in  Delhi. He attended the Govt. Boys Senior Secondary School and is educated till Tenth grade.

Political career
Avtar Singh has been a MLA for one term. He represented the Kalkaji constituency and is a member of the Aam Aadmi Party political party.

Posts held

See also
Aam Aadmi Party
Delhi Legislative Assembly
Kalkaji (Delhi Assembly constituency)
Politics of India
Sixth Legislative Assembly of Delhi

References 

1963 births
Aam Aadmi Party politicians from Delhi
Delhi MLAs 2015–2020
Living people